John McIntyre (born 4 July 1944) is a New Zealand former cricketer. He played 113 first-class matches for Auckland and Canterbury between 1961 and 1983.

See also
 List of Auckland representative cricketers

References

External links
 
 

1944 births
Living people
New Zealand cricketers
Auckland cricketers
Canterbury cricketers
Cricketers from Auckland
South Island cricketers